Sugarmill Woods is an unincorporated, census-designated place (CDP) in southwestern Citrus County, Florida, United States. It is situated a few miles south of Homosassa in the Nature Coast, and its planned community features two golf, swim, and tennis country clubs. The community is purported as one of the first developments in the United States designed to include a greenbelt behind most of its single-family residential lots.

History

Etymology and logo
The name is derived from the Yulee Sugar Mill Ruins in nearby Homosassa. Sugarmill Woods uses the mill and an oak tree as principal elements of its logo. The oak tree is a silhouette taken from a photo of an actual tree, located close to Oak Park Boulevard (CR480), east of Southern Woods. The same tree was also used as part of the eventual Parkland Properties, Inc. logo.

Planning and construction
In 1972, developers from Punta Gorda Isles (PGI) formed Punta Gorda Developers, Inc., and partnered with Bruce Norris, owner of the Norin Corporation, to develop an estimated  of the Twin County Ranch — part of Norin's cattle operations. Together, they formed Parkland Properties, Inc. for the creation of Sugarmill Woods. An estimated  of this property was in fact open pasture, so the partners planted 1,200,000 slash pine seedlings. The partnership dissolved in 1975 when Norris' shares of Parkland were acquired by Punta Gorda Developers.

Platting began in the spring of 1972, with a concept of six "Villages" — Cypress, Oak, Pinewood, Palm, Orange, and Meadow Run — each with their own village centers. 24,000 lots were planned, and July marked the commencement of construction with a ceremonial ground-breaking. The first nine holes of Sugarmill Woods Country Club's (SMWCC) golf course, two tennis courts, and a swimming pool were completed in 1975. The second nine-hole course was completed in November 1978, and the third nine was completed in December, 1981. Another swim and tennis complex in Oak Village was added in 1984 as an extension of the Sugarmill Woods Country Club. In 1995, an 18-hole golf course was constructed in a third village known as Southern Woods.

After several months, no ranchettes were sold and the project was dropped. The parcels were eventually divided and replatted into what is now The Hammocks, The Enclave and sections of SMWCC's nine-hole Oak course.

Assignments and sales
According to Punta Gorda Developer's Jim Sanders in a 2012 interview, sales efforts were severely impacted by the Oil Crisis of 1973, causing cutbacks in planned infrastructure and continued expansion of the next four villages. Although platted and recorded, Pinewood Village and Palm Village (east of Cypress and Oak Village), Orange Village and Meadow Run Village (south of Oak Village in Hernando County, FL), never came to fruition.

That property would be partially developed as Seville and The Dunes Golf Club, which ultimately stalled and, with the exception of a couple dozen homes, became a ghost development. In 1994, Punta Gorda Developers, Inc., assigned all common grounds and legal rights for Cypress Village to the Cypress Village Property Owners Association (CVPOA). In 2002, Florida Landmark Communities, Inc. (successor by merger to Sugarmill Woods Communities, Inc., f/k/a Lehigh Land & Investment, Inc.), assigned all common grounds and rights to Sugarmill Woods Oak Village Association, Inc. In 2005, National Recreational Properties of Sugarmill, LLC (via Florida Landmark Properties, Inc., and Sugarmill Woods Communities, Inc.) assigned all property and rights to Southern Woods Property Owners, Inc.

While a large portion of the eastern regions of the original Twin County Ranch remains pastoral ranch land, the aborted Pinewood and Palm Villages eventually became integrated as part of the Withlacoochee State Forest.

Architecture

Greenbelt
Sugarmill Woods became one of the first developments in the United States with intentions to plat greenbelt acreage behind every single-family residence. According to Jim Sanders in a 2012 interview, the greenbelt was designed for added buffer space, privacy, beauty, and trails for exploring by hiking and horseback riding.

Streets
In his interview, Sanders said many of the street names in Sugarmill Woods were sourced from floral nomenclature. Several streets were also named to honor of early residents, and a few others are concentric to golf. Douglas Street was named for Dr. Douglas, a local dentist. Beverly and Holly were named after his daughters. Sanders Court is named after James (Jim) Sanders, former president and Chairman of Sugarmill Woods, Inc., and earlier, Vice President and Project Manager of Punta Gorda Developers, Inc. Streets named Linder are named after P. Scott Linder, former Director at Punta Gorda Developers. Golf-themed thoroughfares include Golfview, Balata, Masters, Murfield, and Winged Foot. Sugarmill Woods has  Right-of-Ways (ROWs) on the main boulevards, and  ROWs on the secondary and tertiary thoroughfares. The front property line of each lot begins at the ROW boundary.

Lot sizes
Lot dimensions vary depending on intended use and specific street. According to Jim Sanders, it was intended to place one to three lots per acre. Most of the single family lots average  with a  depth. Many of the villas use a  lot.

Single family homes
Single-family houses vary in architecture from 1970s and '80s ranch to '90s and modern Mediterranean styles, some including bungalow-inspired front entry columns, or Spanish-Italian arches and corbels.

Villas, duplexes, condominiums and assisted living
Golfview, Oakleaf, and The Hammocks are the largest villa sections of Sugarmill Woods’ Cypress Village. Golfview is surrounded by the Cypress golf course of SMWCC, while Oakleaf and The Hammocks are encircled by the Oaks course. The Villas at Beechwood Point is a newer development by Sweetwater Homes of Homosassa. It is located on Beech Street, due north of Cypress Circle. Most of the duplexes within Sugarmill Woods sparsely align Oak Park Boulevard. Cypress Run is a 90-unit condominium development: five buildings with 18 condos each, three stories at six condos per floor. Two buildings overlook the Cypress golf course's 9th fairway and green. A pool complex is located in the center of the development. Pinewood Gardens is a 10-unit townhouse-style condominium located on the north side of Cypress Circle. 3rd Fairway Condos I & II, Fairway Woods constitute a 45-unit condominium complex with varying designs and is located on Douglas Street, adjacent the Cypress golf course. Pinewood Green is an 8-unit section of villas located on Douglas Street, adjacent Fairway Woods at the 3rd green of the Cypress golf course. Springwood is a three building, 24-unit, two-story condominium bordering the 5th and 6th fairways of SMWCC's Pine golf course, northeast of Cypress Circle. Pinewood is a 14-unit condominium, located on Beech Street in Cypress Village, and it borders the 2nd fairway of the Pine golf course. Dryden South is a triplex located at Seagrape Street and Cypress Circle. Deer Park, an assisted-living community, is located just west of the intersection of Oak Park Boulevard and Cypress/Oak Boulevards. It features an assisted-living and memory care facility named The Royal Dalton House, and an enclave of 55+ senior residences named Deer Park Cottages. While Deer Park is centrally located within Sugarmill Woods, it was not part of the original plan and has its own association with restrictive covenants.

Playgrounds, sidewalks, and bicycle paths
In a 2012 video interview for the Sugarmill Woods Civic Association, Greenbelt Gazette editor Norman Wagy segues developer Jim Sanders by stating money was a factor for the omission of playgrounds and sidewalks. Sanders said "Yeah, we would have liked to have had more playgrounds, and more sidewalks, and things for people to enjoy and ride their bikes on, and, you can only afford so much."

Governance organizations and clubs

Owner associations
The mix of property types in Sugarmill Woods dictated that the main associations be designated as Property Owners Associations (POA) instead of Homeowner Associations (HOA). The POAs are Cypress Village, Oak Village, and Southern Woods. The Hammocks, Oakleaf, and Fairway Woods have their own recorded HOAs, while Cypress Run, Pinewood Gardens, Springwood, 3rd Fairway Condominiums I & II, The Villas at Beechwood Point, Pinewood and Fairway Run are condominium associations.

The POAs, certain HOAs and condo associations, administer and enforce their own restrictions and bylaws. They are typically structured to include a board of directors and several committees dedicated to the various concerns of the organization, such as Architectural Control, Rules & Regulations, Deed Restrictions, Common Areas, Finance, Public Safety, and Communications.

In Cypress Village, elected board directors are permitted to serve two consecutive 3-year terms without a maximum number of terms, while committee members serve at the pleasure of the Board of Directors by invitation, and without term limits.

Clubs and other organizations
Various clubs and organizations call Sugarmill Woods home, such as the Sugarmill Woods Civic Association, Sugarmill Woods Country Club, Southern Woods Golf Club, Women of Sugarmill Woods, Oak Village Women's Club, Rotary Club of Sugarmill Woods, Sugarmill Crime Watch, and the Community Emergency Response Team, among others.

Geography

Location and area
Sugarmill Woods is located in southern Citrus County at  (28.724789, -82.521192). It is bordered to the north by Homosassa Springs and Lecanto, to the south by Hernando County, to the west by US Highways 19/98 (Suncoast Boulevard), and the east by the Suncoast Parkway Extension (SR 589 Tollway) traversing the Withlacoochee State Forest.

Topography
The CDP's terrain is flat to rolling undulations, and its ground cover varies from sandy, xeric landscapes to dense tropical jungle. Cypress Village also features several detention ponds that belong to the POA or the Sugarmill Woods Country Club.

Climate

Flora & fauna
Sugarmill Woods displays a vast array of plant life. Tree varieties include, but are not limited to, palms, cypress, live oaks, maple, magnolias, hollies, sweetgum, slash and loblolly pines. Common hedges include viburnum, podocarpus and loropetalum. Lawn grasses include St. Augustine, Bahia, Zoysia, and Bermuda. Innumerable bird species migrate through Sugarmill Woods each year, however several dozen varieties call it home. Owls, red-shouldered and red-tailed hawks, eagles, turkey, osprey, sand hill cranes, ibis, peacocks, gulls, cardinals, blue jays, and other common fowl inhabit the area. Numerous reptiles also inhabit the land, including, snakes (including poisonous varieties), tortoises, lizards, and (rarely) alligators. Observed quadruped visitors include bobcats, coyotes, panthers, black bear, white-tailed deer, wild hogs, racoons, foxes, rabbits, skunks, gophers, moles, squirrels, opossums, and armadillos. Bigfoot sightings have been reported with regular frequency near the intersection of Golfview Drive and Cypress Boulevard West.

Transportation

Roads
Sugarmill Woods is served by Citrus County roads and US Highways 19 and 98. Oak Park Boulevard (CR480), Cypress Boulevard, Oak Village Boulevard, and Corkwood Boulevard are its main thoroughfares. While Low Speed Vehicles (LSVs) are permitted on most of Sugarmill Woods' streets per Florida statute, there are no legally-designated streets or paths for standard golf carts.

Pedestrians and bicycles
Although stated as desired and planned by Punta Gorda Developer Jim Sanders, there are currently no sidewalks or bicycle lanes within Sugarmill Woods. A formal effort was launched in 2011 after a survey from the Sugarmill Woods Civic Association demonstrated a supermajority of residents in favor of adding bike lanes to sections of the main boulevards. While the project remains on Citrus County's pedestrian project, it has yet to appear on the Board of County Commissioner's (BOCC) agenda.

Demographics

It is important to note that the CDP's demography is subject to seasonal migratory owners and their preferred registry locations. The CDP's occupancy increases significantly November through April.

According to the US Census Bureau, in 2018 the CDP's population was 8,851. In 2018, 1,507 identified as Veterans. 49.9% of the CDP's residents are 65 and over, 38% are aged 18–64, and 12% are aged 17 or younger. The female population is 53%. The CDP is 90% White, 5% Latino, 3.4% Asian, and 1.6% Black or African American. The median household income for the CDP in 2018 was $48,433. Persons in poverty was 12.3%.

Politics
Sugarmill Woods is located within Precinct 307 of Citrus County. In May 2020, Precinct 307 had 8,994 registered voters, 4,778 (53.1%) listed as Republican, 2,146 (23.9%) Democrats, 1,946 (21.6%) No Party Affiliation (NPA), and 124 (1.4%) Other Parties.

Crime
Annual crime reports for Sugarmill Woods (the CDP or the development) are currently not obtainable from the Citrus County Sheriff's Office, the Florida Department of Law Enforcement (FDLE), or the FBI. The FBI advises, "Since crime is a sociological phenomenon influenced by a variety of factors, the FBI discourages ranking locations or making comparisons as a way of measuring law enforcement effectiveness. Some of this data may not be comparable to previous years because of differing levels of participation over time."

A 2019 third-party report, using estimates based from FBI data, places crime rates for Sugarmill Woods at 3% below the national average.

Education, emergency and medical services

Education
Sugarmill Woods is currently served by the following public schools: Lecanto Primary (Pre-K to 5th Grade), Lecanto Middle (6th-8th Grades), Lecanto High School (9th-12th Grades). High School graduation rates average 92%, while graduation with a baccalaureate-level degree averages 28%. Punta Gorda Developers, Inc., D/B/A Sugarmill Woods Inc., referenced plans for an eventual school in its original deed restrictions for Cypress Village, and sold a  tract located on W Oak Park Blvd to the School Board of Citrus County.

Law enforcement, emergency services, and hospitals
A Citrus County Fire Rescue and Sheriff's Office precinct is centrally located at 5000 Oak Park Boulevard. The proximity of this precinct has vastly reduced crucial response times. In addition, the Sheriff's Office outfits and trains a Crime Watch volunteer detachment that regularly patrols the neighborhoods. In partnership with the Sheriff's Office, some of Sugarmill Woods associations use part of their annual assessments to subsidize augmented patrols for added security.

Hospitals
The closest hospitals with Emergency Rooms are Oak Hill Hospital (approx. ) on Cortez Boulevard in Brooksville (closer to Weeki Wachee), and Citrus Memorial Hospital (approx. ) in Inverness. Oak Hill Hospital maintains an active heliport when needed.

Recreational amenities

Golf, swim, and tennis clubs

Sugarmill Woods Country Club
Punta Gorda Developers christened the Polynesian-styled Sugarmill Woods Golf and Racquet Club (later renamed Sugarmill Woods Golf and Country Club) in 1975 with the opening of the course's first nine holes, which they named the "Cypress" course. The private club features a full gourmet restaurant, bar, pro shop, meeting space, tennis courts and a large L-shaped swimming pool. The golf course's architect was Ron Garl. In 1979, the developers added the nine-hole "Pine" course, and in 1984 completed the 27-hole complex with the opening of the "Oak" course. Today, the course operates 18 holes, including the Cypress and Pine courses, a driving range, the pro shop, the restaurant, a fitness room, and the swimming pool. Membership structures currently include access to Southern Woods and World Woods clubs.

Oak Village Sports Complex
Opened in 1984, the Oak Village Sports Complex (also known as the Oak Village Bath & Tennis Club, formerly Oak Village Tennis and Villa) features a Junior Olympic-sized swimming pool, a baby wading pool, eight tennis courts, four pickleball courts, a 3-walled racquet/handball area, two bocce courts, four shuffleboard courts, a children's play area, and an exercise room.

Southern Woods Golf Club
In 1992, the developers opened the 18-hole, Hale-Irwin-designed Southern Woods Golf Club. The private club offers golf, a driving range, practice green, chipping green, a gourmet restaurant, grill room and bar, and convertible event/meeting space.

World Woods
In 1991, Punta Gorda Developers formed World Woods, Inc. and began construction on a  multi-course complex under the name World Woods. It is located at the northern Hernando County border on US HWY 98, southeast of Oak Village. The property includes two 18-hole championship courses, "Pine Barrens" and "Rolling Oaks", a nine-hole short course, a three-hole practice course, a practice park featuring a uniquely-circular  practice range, and a 36-hole  putting green. Iron ranges and additional practice putting greens are adjacent the first tees of each course for last-minute practice. The course architect was Tom Fazio who said, "This is my best work."

Club sales
In 1994, Punta Gorda Developers Inc. and World Woods Inc. sold all sports complexes to Yukihisa Inoue of Kyoto, Japan. His parent company, Interfive Florida Corporation, operates the Sugarmill Woods Country Club and Oak Village Sports Complex as SUNTACC & COMPANY, Inc., and Southern Woods Country Club as FLOVICC & COMPANY, Inc., while maintaining World Woods Inc. as his premier golfing destination. In 2019, the Sugarmill Woods Country Club, Oak Village Sports Complex, and Southern Woods Country Club were listed for sale at $3,000,000.

In December 2021, Sugarmill Woods Country Club, Sugarmill Woods Oak Village Bath and Tennis Club, Southern Woods Golf Club, and World Woods Golf Club were purchased by Toronto Canada golf developer Cabot who operates Cabot Cape Breton in Nova Scotia and Cabot Saint Lucia. Cabot subsequently placed Sugarmill Woods Country Club, Sugarmill Woods Oak Village Bath and Tennis Club, and Southern Woods Golf Club for sale, retaining World Woods Golf Club for further resort development.

Links Golf, LLC of Tampa, Florida acquired Sugarmill Wood's clubs from Cabot in May 2022 and assumed operations in July. PGA instructor Scott Yates and wife, Penny Parks are listed owners.

The Suncoast Trail
Its northern trailhead is located at its intersection with US Highway 98, east of Oak Village. Planned for completion in 2022, the "Suncoast 2" project will extend the trail another  and provide another access point for Sugarmill Woods at Oak Park Boulevard. Citrus County currently has plans for a MUP along US HWY 98 from the south-side intersection with Oak Village Boulevard, to the US HWY 98 trailhead.

Nearby recreational sports
Homosassa and Crystal River are renowned for boating, fishing, scalloping, springs snorkeling, and their nature and wildlife trails. When permitted, hunters flock to the adjacent Withlacoochee State Forest for a variety of game. The Hernando Sportsman's Club is a few miles south on US HWY 19, and offers a world-class shooting sports facility. The area has also become known as a haven for motorcyclists due to its proximity to some of Florida's best riding and support infrastructure.

Media

Print
Several news and informational media outlets serve Sugarmill Woods, including the Citrus County Chronicle, Greenbelt Gazette, Village Voice, and Sugarmill Neighbors.

TV and Internet
Charter Communication's Spectrum is the sole hard-line cable TV provider for Sugarmill Woods. It also offers high-speed internet and telephone options. Tampa's broadcast television market primarily serves the CDP, although Ocala's over-the-air broadcasts may be received with the proper equipment. Spectrum and CenturyLink are the primary wired internet service providers for the CDP. Satellite options are also available, including Starlink, Dish Network and DirecTV.

Phone
Sugarmill Woods is served by a variety of cellular phone services such as Verizon Wireless, AT&T Mobility, T-Mobile /Sprint. Cell towers are located on US98 near US19/98, and north of the main entrance on US19 off Industrial Lane. AT&T is the legacy landline phone provider for the CDP.

Social media
Numerous social media websites offer additional informal news, entertainment and other services to Sugarmill Woods, including Nextdoor.com, Facebook and others.

Controversies

Cypress Village

Lapsed deed restrictions

In 2003, the CVPOA allowed its deed restrictions to lapse by failing to follow the statutory guidelines necessary to satisfy requirements under the Marketable Record Title Act (MRTA). Legal efforts undertaken after the lapse date, and for the next several years, were ultimately unsuccessful. The CVPOA changed management companies twice during that time. It also continued to function “business as usual”, citing violators, filing liens, collecting fines and annual assessments, updating its deed restrictions, and providing copies of them to new and prospective buyers. This continued until late 2016, when a few key Board directors became aware of the problem. The POA abruptly halted its violation and lien process at the end of 2016. In 2017, certain directors of the POA gathered historical information and strategized a way forward. In September of that year, the Board of Directors met to share the news of the expired restrictions. The members were formally notified a few months later when it was announced that the CVPOA would begin the process to revitalize the lapsed restrictions. A voting package was distributed to each recorded lot owner in October 2018, with a vote to be tallied at a meeting that December. Although the vote was heavily contested for improper and misdirected procedures, the revitalization narrowly passed after a two-month extension of the vote. A mandatory legal review from Florida's Department of Economic Opportunity was successful, and the CVPOA's revitalized deed restrictions were recorded and legally enforceable as of May, 2019.

Village Services Cooperative lawsuit
Previous to the CVPOA's Revitalization vote, it abruptly terminated the services of its attorney and those of its community manager, Village Services Cooperative (VSC). This triggered a lawsuit from VSC in August 2018, who, according to the lawsuit's complaint, believes that it was improperly terminated according to the terms of their employment contract. The CVPOA launched its defense and counterclaim arguing that VSC was complicit in knowledge of the lapsed restrictions and failed to fully notify the board of directors. The counterclaim also stated that VSC conspired to obscure that information from certain directors, and that it granted certain favors to a select group of owners (such as exempting them from assessments), that VSC also conducted improper meetings, failed to maintain adequate records, denied access to accounting software, and that it provided false contract information to the POA, among other accusations. The lawsuit remains active.

Director opt-out lawsuit
In September 2019, a CVPOA director, who was one of the three principal owners that sponsored the revitalization of deed restrictions, filed a lawsuit to have their property removed from deed restrictions (AKA "opting out"), citing a conflict of interest with their home office, and threats of retribution from other directors. A firestorm of criticism ensued after the director, via social media, announced their intention to remain on the board of directors. The lawsuit was settled a few months later by the director withdrawing their lawsuit under the condition that the POA pay for its own legal fees.

Oaks Course closure
Numerous temporary facility closures occurred between 2010 and 2020 due to decreased membership revenue and resultant deterioration and/or failed inspections. Golf, swim, and tennis facilities were all affected.

In the late May 2019, the Sugarmill Woods Country Club general manager announced that the "Oaks" nine-hole golf course would be closed indefinitely, purportedly due to a failed irrigation system and the lack of available funds to repair it. The condition of the course has since deteriorated and will require full rehabilitation. Approximately 197 golf-front residences were impacted.

Oak Village

New Seville / Dunes Lawsuits 
In June 2014, the new developer for the stalled Seville and Dunes development, South Oak Village, LLC, filed a "Statutory Way-of-Necessity" lawsuit against Citrus County. The suit argues for roadway access to Oak Village Boulevard's southern terminus (stub-out) at the Hernando/Citrus county line, claiming its tract was landlocked. During the course of the lawsuit, Citrus County deeded half of the stub-out to each adjacent owner. As of June 2020, the lawsuit remains active with multiple defendants joining the suit, including Sugarmill Woods Oak Village Association and owners of the stub-out.

In January 2019, South Oak Village, LLC launched a separate lawsuit claiming Sugarmill Woods Oak Village Association failed to preserve its deed restrictions in 2010 by improper statutory procedures mandated by MRTA. The suit remains active.

US HWY 98 Median Project Dispute 
In 2018, Oak Village's Board of Directors, presided by James (Jim) Roys, researched and requested a Florida Department of Transportation (FDOT) grant for project to beautify a one-mile stretch central to Oak Village along US HWY 98's median between the intersections of Tea Rose and Lone Pine Streets. The project was administered by the Citrus County Board of County Commissioners (BOCC). In October 2019, the FDOT approved a grant of $355,000 following a landscape plan tendered by Margaret Moore Landscape Planning and Design of Trinity, FL. The plan ultimately specified installation of shrubberies, plants, sod and mulch between the intersections Oak Village Blvd and Lone Pine St, reducing the original length of the project. The BOCC received bids from four contractors, one located in Homosassa FL, the others located in Jacksonville FL, Wilton Manors FL (Fort Lauderdale), and Homestead FL. Nancy Weeks Inc. of Homosassa was low bidder and contract winner, signing it on December 4, 2019. Under the Scope of the agreement, the contractor would be responsible for watering, litter removal and disease/pest control. Provisions for weed control and maintenance of grass height were absent.

Over the next year, the project was planted and maintained per contract specifications by contractor Nancy Weeks Inc. Complaints over nursery design, dying and/or stolen plants, overgrown grass, unkept mulch and weed-ravaged sections ensued and plagued the project for months. In the meantime, Oak Village board President Jim Roys abruptly resigned without explanation and moved away. Longtime Greenbelt Gazette Editor, Norman Wagy, publicly vouched for President Roys’ character when rumors swirled of potential impropriety regarding the median beautification project. In December 2020, contractor Nancy Weeks turned the project over to Oak Village, now presided by Ed Schiller. In the ensuing months, a new board of directors was elected with David Quinn now presiding. Faced with a project in shambles that would cost $37,000 annually to their association, a meeting was held to vote on abandoning the project. The subsequent vote was overwhelmingly in favor of abandonment and the return to original condition. Notification of the voting results accompanied formal requests in June 2021 to the FDOT, the BOCC and the contractor Nancy Weeks. The FDOT sent a letter approving the request under the condition of no further cost to itself. Nancy Weeks responded with an offer to remove all plantings and return the median to former condition at no cost. The BOCC, led by Commissioner Scott Carnahan, vehemently objected, citing grave concerns over future grant requests, and voted to keep Oak Village accountable to the contract, threatening additional tax assessments on all Oak Village properties to cover annual landscaping maintenance costs. According to the Citrus Chronicle, the BOCC's legal administration was handled by County Attorney Denise Dymond Lyn — a Cypress Village attorney of record in 2003 during multiple failed attempts to preserve its deed restrictions under MRTA.

In February 2022, Citrus County Commissioners unanimously voted to accept an FDOT offer to remove all plantings and overgrowth in preparation for new sod, which Citrus County would plant. That agreement also called for Oak Village's association to pay the estimated $36,500 cost for the sod.

References

External links
 Sugarmill Woods Civic Association
 Sugarmill Woods County Club
 Southern Woods Golf Club
 World Woods Golf Club

Census-designated places in Citrus County, Florida
Unincorporated communities in Citrus County, Florida